Edmonton Meadowlark was a provincial electoral district in Alberta, Canada, mandated to return a single member to the Legislative Assembly of Alberta using the first past the post method of voting from 1971 to 2019.

The electoral district located on the western edge of Edmonton was created in the 1971 boundary redistribution from the old electoral districts of Edmonton Jasper Place and Edmonton West.

The district has switched support between Progressive Conservative and Liberal candidates with regular frequency since it was created, a trend broken by the election of the New Democrat MLA Jon Carson in the 2015 general election.

History
The electoral district was created in the 1971 boundary redistribution from the old electoral districts of Edmonton Jasper Place and Edmonton West. The 1993 redistribution would see the district go through a significant redrawing as most of the riding which was south of Whitemud Drive would be moved into the new district of Edmonton-McClung. The riding remained a rectangle shape between Whitemud and Stony Plain road with little changes made in 1996 and 2003.

The 2010 electoral boundary re-distribution would see a significant change as the riding was extended well beyond Stony Plain road up to Yellowhead Trail into land that was once in Edmonton-Calder and Edmonton-Glenora.

Boundary history

Electoral history

The electoral district was created in the 1971 boundary redistribution. The election held that year saw Progressive Conservative candidate Gerard Amerongen pickup the new district for his party. He was successful after running as a candidate in various districts since the 1950s. Amerongen was elected as Speaker of the Assembly when it met for its first session after the election in 1972.

Amerongen won re-election with increasing majorities three more times in the 1975, 1979 and 1982 general elections. He ran for a fifth term in the 1986 general election but was defeated in a shocking upset by Liberal candidate Grant Mitchell. This was only the second time in Alberta history that the Speaker of the Legislature had been defeated.

Mitchell was re-elected to his second term with a large majority in the 1989 general election. He ran for re-election in the Edmonton-McClung after redistricting created the new district out of most of the old land that covered Meadowlark. The new boundaries of Meadowlark returned Liberal candidate Karen Leibovici who won her first term with a substantial majority to hold the seat for her party.

Leibovici won her second term (in a closely contested race in the 1997 general election) defeating Progressive Conservative candidate Laurie Pushor. In the 2001 general election she was defeated by Progressive Conservative candidate, Bob Maskell, who won by 600 votes to pick up the district.

Maskell would only stay for a single term in office as he was defeated by Maurice Tougas in the 2004 general election. Tougas did not stand for re-election in 2008 due to frustrations with being an opposition MLA, and Progressive Conservative candidate Raj Sherman picked up the open district.

Sherman was removed from the Progressive Conservative caucus after making unsubstantiated allegations against the Alberta Government regarding abuses against staff working under Alberta Health Services. He at first sat as an Independent on November 22, 2010 than on March 15, 2011 he began caucusing with the Liberal caucus as an Independent. He was elected as leader of the provincial Liberals on September 10, 2011 and became a full member of the Liberal caucus two days later. He was re-elected in the 2012 provincial election and decided to retire from politics in 2015.

Like the rest of the city, Edmonton-Meadowlark swung hard to the NDP in that election, with Jon Carson easily capturing the seat. The riding was abolished for the 2019 election, replaced by Edmonton-West Henday.

Legislature results

1971 general election

1975 general election

1979 general election

1982 general election

1986 general election

1989 general election

1993 general election

1997 general election

2001 general election

2004 general election

2008 general election

2012 general election

2015 general election

Senate nominee results

2004 Senate nominee election district results

Voters had the option of selecting 4 Candidates on the Ballot

2012 Senate nominee election district results

Student Vote

2004 election

On November 19, 2004 a Student Vote was conducted at participating Alberta schools to parallel the 2004 Alberta general election results. The vote was designed to educate students and simulate the electoral process for persons who have not yet reached the legal majority. The vote was conducted in 80 of the 83 provincial electoral districts with students voting for actual election candidates. Schools with a large student body that reside in another electoral district had the option to vote for candidates outside of the electoral district then where they were physically located.

2012 election

See also
List of Alberta provincial electoral districts
Meadowlark Park is a residential neighbourhood in west Edmonton, Alberta, Canada

References

Further reading

External links
Elections Alberta
The Legislative Assembly of Alberta

Former provincial electoral districts of Alberta
Politics of Edmonton